The 1996 Indian general election were held to elect 20 members to the eleventh Lok Sabha from Kerala. Both Indian National Congress (INC)-led United Democratic Front (UDF) and Left Democratic Front (LDF), led by Communist Party of India (Marxist) (CPI(M)) won 10 seats each. Turnout for the election was at 70.66%

Alliances and parties 

UDF is a Kerala legislative alliance formed by INC veteran K. Karunakaran. LDF comprises primarily of CPI(M) and the CPI, forming the Left Front in the national level. Bharatiya Janata Party (BJP) contested in 18 seats.

United Democratic Front

Left Democratic Front

Bharatiya Janata Party

List of elected MPs

Results

Performance of political parties

By constituency

See also 

 Elections in Kerala
 Politics of Kerala

References 

1996 elections in India
Elections in Kerala